The first season of the American science fiction television series Fringe commenced airing on the Fox network on September 9, 2008, and concluded on May 12, 2009. It was produced by Bad Robot Productions in association with Warner Bros. Television, and its showrunners were Jeff Pinkner and J.H. Wyman. The first season introduces a Federal Bureau of Investigation "Fringe Division" team based in Boston, Massachusetts under the supervision of Homeland Security. The team uses unorthodox "fringe" science and FBI investigative techniques to investigate a series of unexplained, often ghastly occurrences, which are related to mysteries surrounding a parallel universe. FBI agent Olivia Dunham is portrayed by actress Anna Torv, while actors Joshua Jackson and John Noble play father-son duo Peter and Walter Bishop. Other regular cast members include Lance Reddick, Jasika Nicole, Blair Brown, Mark Valley, and Kirk Acevedo.

The season produced 21 episodes, although only 20 of them aired as part of the first season. The unaired episode, "Unearthed", was broadcast as part of the second season as episode 11 as a special episode.

Cast

Main cast 
 Anna Torv as Olivia Dunham
 Joshua Jackson as Peter Bishop
 Lance Reddick as Phillip Broyles
 Kirk Acevedo as Charlie Francis
 Blair Brown as Nina Sharp
 Jasika Nicole as Astrid Farnsworth
 Mark Valley as John Scott
 John Noble as Dr. Walter Bishop

Recurring cast 
 Michael Cerveris as September/The Observer
 Ari Graynor as Rachel Dunham
 Lily Pilblad as Ella Blake
 Chance Kelly as Mitchell Loeb
 Michael Gaston as Sanford Harris
 Jared Harris as David Robert Jones
 Trini Alvarado as Samantha Loeb
 Clark Middleton as Edward Markham
 David Call as Nick Lane

Guest stars 
Episodic guest stars included: Billy Burke, Derek Cecil, Jennifer Ferrin, James Frain, Jason Butler Harner, Neal Huff, Gillian Jacobs, Michael Kelly, Randall Duk Kim, Spencer List, Jefferson Mays, Susan Misner, Ebon Moss-Bachrach, Keith Nobbs, Zak Orth, Peter Outerbridge, Al Sapienza, Felix Solis, Kenneth Tigar, Yul Vazquez, and Kiersten Warren. Leonard Nimoy first appears as Dr. William Bell in an uncredited, voice-only role in the season finale.

Season summary 
The first season of Fringe begins with the introduction of the main characters, as Olivia is brought aboard the Fringe division following the critical injury of her partner, John Scott, in an event tied to the Fringe division. As part of her investigation, she finds she needs the knowledge and experience of Walter Bishop, currently institutionalized in a mental hospital. Olivia blackmails Walter's estranged son, Peter, to be Walter's legal guardian, allowing his release from the institution. Olivia finds that Walter's knowledge in the area of fringe science to be critical for her job, and convinces Peter to remain as Walter's guardian; Peter, initially resentful due to events in his childhood, starts to participate directly in the cases, his abilities as a jack-of-all-trades being a benefit to both Walter's scientific needs and Olivia's investigations. Walter himself struggles with life outside the institution, plagued by a secret from his past and often resorting to recreational drugs. Olivia comes to discover that Massive Dynamic, a company that Walter used to be a part of, is connected with several of the Fringe cases.

The Fringe team starts to learn of a bio-terrorist group known as ZFT (in German, Zerstörung durch Fortschritte der Technologie, translated as "Destruction by Advancement of Technology"), which seem to be after several of Walter's old experiments. In one case, a group of men led by Mitchell Loeb have recreated Walter's technology used to pass through solid matter to steal several components of a device, constructed by Walter, from banks. With the assembled device, Loeb's team is able to teleport David Robert Jones, a former Massive Dynamics employee and leader of the ZFT, out of a high security prison. Jones attempts to sway Olivia to his side as a "soldier" in an upcoming "war," making her aware that she, as a child, was part of a test run by Walter and his partner William Bell of the nootropic drug, Cortexiphan, that gave her psychokinetic powers. Olivia refuses, disbelieving his claim but realizing that evidence to support it appears true. Meanwhile, the Observer meets with Walter and takes him to Walter's old beach house, where he finds a device he once made that can close a portal to a parallel universe. Tracking Jones, Olivia finds that all of the Fringe events have formed a spiral, centering on Reiden Lake in New York, and she, Peter, and Walter are able to prevent Jones from crossing over to a parallel universe using the device that Walter found, killing Jones in the process. Later Walter is seen at  a cemetery where he mourns over a grave labeled "Peter Bishop."

Olivia tries to get answers from Nina Sharp on Jones' motive, but she only directs her to a meeting with Bell. Olivia, while en route to the meeting, finds herself in the parallel universe, in the World Trade Center office of William Bell.

Episodes

Development

Co-creators J. J. Abrams, Alex Kurtzman, and Roberto Orci began the brainstorming process for Fringe in the spring of 2008. They avoided emulating Abrams' other show, Lost, because they believed its mysteries made it difficult to attract new viewers. Instead, the co-creators studied crime procedurals, such as the American series CSI: Crime Scene Investigation and the franchise Law & Order, in an attempt to merge that genre with a more mythology-based show without creating only standalone episodes. Orci explained, "We studied procedurals specifically to try and merge the two. Very against our instincts to do that, but when nine of the top TV shows are called Law & Order and CSI, you have to study them a little bit and figure out what it is that they're doing." Abrams has also listed the science fiction television series The Twilight Zone, Altered States, and The X-Files as well as the 1979 film Alien as inspirations for Fringe. 

Jeff Pinkner, an executive producer on two of Abrams' other television series Lost and Alias, was hired to serve as showrunner and executive producer for Fringe. He described Fringe as being concerned with "primal fear", as "our bodies and our minds are, at the end of the day, unknowable. The ways our bodies betray us can be terrifying."

Critics as well as those involved in the show's production have acknowledged that Fringe had a rocky beginning. Abrams later noted, "It's going to sound weird, but a show starts talking to you and telling you what it wants to be. It took us a while to hear it." The series struggled early on, as the first ten episodes had continuous rewrites and expensive last-minute reshoots. Actor Lance Reddick noted "It was a constant struggle. It just didn't feel like a signature [J.J. Abrams] show — not yet." Pinkner has also acknowledged that early episodes were often too neatly wrapped and solved. "We found that, absolutely, early on, we were falling into the trap of—the tease would be fantastic. And then we would too quickly answer it and [reduce] the tension," he said. "And we've tried to course-correct and have the tease promise" questions that don't get answered right away. 

The writers began to focus more attention on the series' mythology when Akiva Goldsman temporarily joined Fringe to write and direct a mid-season episode, "Bad Dreams." Believing "this is the stuff fans want to know", he and Bryan Burk were able to convince the other series writers to begin revealing the concept of parallel universes, despite the writers' initial intention to merely tease the idea of two worlds over two seasons. They also attempted to make Olivia's personal life more relatable by ending her storyline with John Scott and giving her a sister and niece. Abrams noted that Olivia was evolving from a "guarded, protective woman" who did not have strong relationships with others to someone more vulnerable; the presence of Olivia's sister, he noted, helped give the character "at least opportunities to be warmer to someone." By the middle of the season, critics and regular viewers noted Fringe had started to improve. Kevin Reilly observed around this time, "I was looking for evidence that it was becoming their favorite show. And it was during the back half of the season that people started to say, 'This is now appointment television for me."

Reception

Ratings
Fringe finished its first season with an average of 8.8 million viewers per episode, making it the most watched new series for the 18–49 demographic. In Canada on CTV, Fringes first season had an episode average of 1.3 million viewers and finished in 19th place.

Reviews
On Rotten Tomatoes, the season has an approval rating of 84% with an average score of 7.5 out of 10 based on 25 reviews. The website's critical consensus reads, "Action-packed, suspenseful, and filled with intriguing twists, Fringe is a smart sci-fi series that's compelling enough to overcome its occasionally uneven plotting." Metacritic, a review aggregate website, gave the first season 67/100 based upon 25 critical reviews, indicating a "generally favorable" reception. While the series was perceived to have a shaky start, the season finale aired to general fan acclaim.

Home video releases
The first season of Fringe was released on DVD and Blu-ray in region 1 on September 8, 2009, in region 2 on September 28, 2009 and in region 4 on September 30, 2009. The sets includes all 20 episodes of season one on a 7-disc DVD set and a 5-disc Blu-ray set presented in anamorphic widescreen. Special features on the sets include three commentary tracks—"Pilot" with co-creators J. J. Abrams, Alex Kurtzman and Roberto Orci, "The Ghost Network" with writers J. R. Orci, David H. Goodman and executive producer Bryan Burk, and "Bad Dreams" with writer/director Akiva Goldsman and executive producer Jeff Pinkner. Episodic behind-the-scene featurettes include "Deciphering the Scene" on every episode and "The Massive Undertaking" on select episodes. Also included on select episodes are "Dissected Files", deleted scenes. The main featurettes include "Evolution: The Genesis of Fringe", "The Casting of Fringe", "The Real Science Behind Fringe" and "Fringe Visual Effects". Also included is "Roberto Orci's Production Diary", a short featurette titled "Gene the Cow" and a gag reel. Exclusive to the Blu-ray version is "Fringe Pattern Analysis".

References

External links 

 
 

1
2008 American television seasons
2009 American television seasons